Bart Ramakers (born 1963) is a Belgian artist and art curator. He is known for the staged photographs in which he creates a "mythology for a new world". His works also include video and sculpture.

Ramakers reworks classic mythological and religious themes in the light of actuality: gender equality, environment, and solidarity, often with a nod to art history. His collaborations include Panamarenko, Tom Herck, William Sweetlove, Cecilia Paredes among others.

Life and work
Ramakers was born in 1963, near Maaseik, and was influenced by his father, an art amateur. He studied drawing at the academies of Maaseik and Maasmechelen and history at the Katholieke Universiteit Leuven. During his studies, he was active as a cartoonist, illustrator and graphical artist in several student publications, such as Veto. After graduating, Ramakers worked in advertising and marketing until he started his artistic career in 2009.

Selected projects
 The Apotheosis of Flora, for the D'Ursel Castle and De Notelaer in Hingene, 2013
 Strangers in the Night, 2014
 A Divine Comedy, 2016
 The Anatomy of Beauty, 2017
 Autopia - Automats for a New World, 2018
 Flora and the Water Warriors, with William Sweetlove, 2019
 The Bride Unveiled, 2021
 Sandwiched, 2022

Selected exhibitions
 Sweet 18, in the Castle d'Ursel, 2015
 Autopia, in Wilford X Temse, 2018
 Weill ich ein Mädchen bin, Odapark Venray, 2018
 Anastasia, with William Sweetlove and Roel Stels, Lier, 2020

Group exhibitions curated by Bart Ramakers include:
 One big Family, with Caroline Bouchard, Alden Biesen Castle, 2015
 Hallelujah!, Triamant Gerkenberg Bree, 2021

Publications 

Bart Ramakers' work is published in the books:
 Trouble in Paradise, 2015
 Revelations, 2018
 Flora and the Water Warriors, 2019
 The Bride Unveiled, 2021

References

External links
 

Living people
1963 births
Belgian contemporary artists
21st-century Belgian male artists
Belgian photographers
Belgian art curators